Sandilch (Σάνδιλ, Σάνδιλχος; Turkic "boat) was a chieftain of the Utigur Bulgars in the 6th century. The origin of the name is probably Turkic. Although he initially protested against leading the Utigurs into war against a related people, the Kutrigurs, the Byzantine Emperor Justinian I (527–565) convinced him to do so through diplomatic persuasion and bribery. The Utigurs led by Sandilch attacked the Kutrigurs, who suffered great losses. 

Sandilch's own words:
"It is neither fair nor decent to exterminate our tribesmen (the Kutrigurs), who not only speak a language, identical to ours, who are our neighbours and have the same dressing and manners of life, but who are also our relatives, even though subjected to other lords".
After decimating each other, the remnant of Zabergan's and Sandilch's Bulgars acquired Dacia during the reign of Emperor Maurice.

Honours
Sandilh Point in Antarctica is named after Sandilch.

See also
Utigurs
Kutrigurs

References

Bibliography

6th-century rulers in Europe
6th-century soldiers
6th-century Turkic people
Turkic rulers